Astan Dabo (born May 30, 1992) is a Malian basketball center, drafted by the Connecticut Sun of the Women's National Basketball Association. She has played in France and has represented Mali at 2010 World Championships.

WNBA
She was selected in the first round of the 2012 WNBA Draft (9th overall) by the Connecticut Sun.

References

1992 births
Living people
Centers (basketball)
Connecticut Sun draft picks
Malian expatriate basketball people in the United States
Malian women's basketball players
Malian expatriates in the United States
Tarbes Gespe Bigorre players
21st-century Malian people